Rastehgan (also Romanized as Rastehgān and Rastegān) is a village in Dastjerd Rural District, Khalajastan District, Qom County, Qom Province, Iran. At the 2006 census, its population was 141, in 65 families.

References 

Populated places in Qom Province